Scott McCloud (born Scott McLeod; June 10, 1960) is an American cartoonist and comics theorist.  He is best known for his non-fiction books about comics: Understanding Comics (1993), Reinventing Comics (2000), and Making Comics (2006), all of which also use the medium of comics.

He established himself as a comics creator in the 1980s as an independent superhero cartoonist and advocate for creator's rights. He rose to prominence in the industry beginning in the 1990s for his non-fiction works about the medium, and has advocated the use of new technology in the creation and distribution of comics.

Early life
McCloud was born in 1960 in Boston, Massachusetts, the youngest child of Willard Wise (a blind inventor and engineer) and Patricia Beatrice McLeod, and spent most of his childhood in Lexington, Massachusetts. He decided he wanted to be a comics artist in 1975, during his junior year in high school.

He attended Syracuse University's Illustration program and graduated with a Bachelor of Fine Arts degree in 1982.

Career

Fiction

During his high school years, he collaborated on comics with his schoolmate Kurt Busiek. While still teenagers, the two of them, together with fellow teenagers Christopher Bing (a 2001 Caldecott Medal winner) and Richard Howell, created the first licensed Marvel/DC crossover comic Pow! Biff! Pops!, a one-shot sold in conjunction with a 1978 Boston Pops performance of comics-themed music.

While working as a production artist at DC Comics, McCloud created the light-hearted science fiction/superhero comic book series Zot! in 1984, in part as a reaction to the increasingly grim direction that superhero comics were taking in the 1980s.

His other print comics include Destroy!! (a deliberately over-the-top, oversized single-issue comic book, intended as a parody of formulaic superhero fights), the 1998 graphic novel The New Adventures of Abraham Lincoln (done with a mixture of computer-generated and manually drawn digital images), 12 issues writing DC Comics' Superman Adventures in the late 1990s and the 2005 three-issue series Superman: Strength, and the 2015 graphic novel The Sculptor.

Creator's Bill of Rights
McCloud was the principal author of the Creator's Bill of Rights, a 1988 document with the stated aim of protecting the rights of comic book creators and help aid against the exploitation of comic artists and writers by corporate work-for-hire practices. The group that adopted the Bill also included artists Kevin Eastman, Dave Sim, and  Stephen R. Bissette. The Bill included twelve rights such as "The right to full ownership of what we fully create," and "The right to prompt payment of a fair and equitable share of profits derived from all of our creative work."

24-hour comic
In 1990, McCloud coined the idea of a 24-hour comic: a complete 24-page comic created by a single cartoonist in 24 consecutive hours. It was a mutual challenge with cartoonist Steve Bissette, intended to compel creative output with a minimum of self-restraining contemplation. Thousands of cartoonists have since taken up the challenge, including Neil Gaiman; Kevin Eastman, co-creator of Teenage Mutant Ninja Turtles; Dave Sim, who published some of his work from this challenge in Cerebus the Aardvark; and Rick Veitch who used it as a springboard for his comic Rarebit Fiends.

Non-fiction about comics 

In the early 1990s, McCloud began a series of three books about the medium and business of comics, all done in comics form. The first of these was Understanding Comics: The Invisible Art, published in 1993, which established him as a popular comics theorist, described as the "Aristotle of comics" and the "Marshall McLuhan of comics". The book was a wide-ranging exploration of the definition, history, vocabulary, and methods of the medium of comics, and is widely cited in academic discussions of the medium.

In 2000, McCloud published Reinventing Comics: How Imagination and Technology Are Revolutionizing an Art Form, in which he outlined twelve "revolutions" taking place, that he argued would be keys to the growth and success of comics as a popular and creative medium.

McCloud returned to focus on the medium itself in 2006 with Making Comics: Storytelling Secrets of Comics, Manga, and Graphic Novels, an instructional guide to the process of producing comics, which he followed with a promotional lecture tour with his family of all 50 U.S. states and parts of Europe.

He is currently working on a third draft of layouts for an upcoming book on visual communication.  McCloud has described the book as "a preposterously ambitious full color project covering the evolution and biology of vision; principles of visual perception; demonstrations of how visual elements behave in the mind’s eye; best practices for clarity, explanation, and effective rhetoric; and some personal reflections on [my] family’s experiences with blindness."

Technology 
Beginning in the late 1990s, McCloud was an early advocate of micropayments. He was an adviser to BitPass, a company that provided an online micropayment system, which he helped launch with the publication of The Right Number, an online graphic novella priced at US$0.25 for each chapter.

Among the techniques he explores is the "infinite canvas" permitted by a web browser, allowing panels to be spatially arranged in ways not possible in the finite, two-dimensional, paged format of a physical book.

Google commissioned him in 2008 to create a comic serving as the press release introducing their web browser Chrome.

Personal life 
McCloud lives in California. In 1988 he married Ivy Ratafia, and they had two daughters together. Ivy died in a car accident in April 2022.

Awards
1985 Jack Kirby Award for Best New Series for Zot!
1985 Russ Manning Most Promising Newcomer Award for Zot!
1994 Eisner Award for Best Comics-Related Book for Understanding Comics
1994 Harvey Award for Best Writer for Understanding Comics
1994 Harvey Award for Best Graphic Album/Original Material for Understanding Comics
1994 Harvey Award for Best Biographical, Historical or Journalistic Presentation for Understanding Comics
2001 Harvey Award for Best Biographical/Historical Presentation for Reinventing Comics
2007 Eagle Award for Favourite Comics-Related Book for Making Comics
2007 Quill Award for Best Graphic Novel for Making Comics

Nominations
1988 Harvey Award for Best Cartoonist for Zot!
1988 Eisner Award for Best Single Issue for Zot! #14
1988 Eisner Award for Best Continuing Series for Zot!
1988 Eisner Award for Best Black-and-White Series for Zot!
1988 Eisner Award for Best Writer/Artist for Zot!
1991 Harvey Award for Best Writer for Zot!
1991 Harvey Award for Best Single Issue or Story for Zot! #33
1991 Eisner Award for Best Story or Single Issue for Zot! #33
1991 Eisner Award for Best Continuing Series for Zot!
1991 Eisner Award for Best Black-and-White Series for Zot!
1991 Eisner Award for Best Writer for Zot!
1992 Harvey Award for Best Single Issue or Story for Zot! #35
1993 Harvey Award for Best Biographical, Historical or Journalistic Presentation for Understanding Comics: The Slideshow!
1994 Hugo Award for Best Related Non-Fiction Book for Understanding Comics
1998 Eisner Award for Best Single Issue for Superman Adventures #3 ("Distant Thunder"; with Rick Burchett and Terry Austin)
1998 Eisner Award for Best Serialized Story for Superman Adventures #11–12 ("The War Within"; with Rick Burchett and Terry Austin)
1998 Eisner Award for Best Writer for Superman Adventures
2007 Harvey Award for Best Biographical, Historical or Journalistic Presentation for Making Comics

Bibliography
Zot!
The Original Zot!: Book One (issues 1-4) (Eclipse Books, 1990) 
Zot!: Book 1 (issues 1-10) (Kitchen Sink Press, 1997) 
Zot!: Book 2 (issues 11–15 and 17–18) (Kitchen Sink Press, 1998) 
Zot!: Book 3 (issues 16 and 21-27) (Kitchen Sink Press, 1998) 
Zot!: The Complete Black and White Collection: 1987–1991 (issues 11-36, with 19 and 20 in layout form only) (Harper Paperbacks, 2008) 
Understanding Comics: The Invisible Art (1993)
Reinventing Comics: How Imagination and Technology Are Revolutionizing an Art Form (2000)
Making Comics: Storytelling Secrets of Comics, Manga and Graphic Novels (2006)
The New Adventures of Abraham Lincoln (Image Comics,  1998) 
24 Hour Comics (editor) (About Comics, 2004) 
Destroy!! (Oversized Edition) (Eclipse Books,  1986)
The Sculptor (First Second, 2015) 978-1-59643-573-5
Superman Adventures #2-13 (DC Comics, 1997)
Superman: Strength #1-3 (DC Comics, 2005)
Google Chrome (2008)
Best American Comics 2014 (editor) (Houghton Mifflin Harcourt, 2014-09-05)

Typography
Various fonts used in Scott McCloud's comics have been recreated digitally, and have been released by Comicraft:
Scott McCloud/McComicBookFont: The font used in Making Comics: Storytelling Secrets of Comics, Manga and Graphic Novels. The family includes 4 weights (Regular, Bold, Semi Bold, Extra Bold).
The Sculptor: Designed by John ’JG’ Roshell of Comicraft, it is based on the font used in The Sculptor. The family includes 3 weights (Regular, Bold, Heavy).
Digital Delivery: Designed by John ’JG’ Roshell of Comicraft, it is based on the font used in Reinventing Comics: How Imagination and Technology Are Revolutionizing an Art Form. The family includes 5 fonts in 2 weights (Regular, Bold) with complimentary italic, and a Display font.

References

External links

 
 24 Hour Comics
 McCloud profile on RAW's site
 Scott McCloud French publications Bedetheque 
 Scott McCloud biography on Lambiek Comiclopedia
 TED Talks: Scott McCloud on comics at TED in 2005
 Scott McCloud's page on Comiclopedia

1960 births
American webcomic creators
Harvey Award winners for Best Writer
Living people
Artists from Boston
Syracuse University College of Visual and Performing Arts alumni
Lexington High School alumni
Comics scholars